Crucero de verano is a 1964 Italian film directed by Luis Lucia. It stars actor Gabriele Ferzetti.

References

External links

1964 films
Italian musical comedy films
1960s Italian-language films
1960s Italian films